was a Japanese poet who excelled in the fields of waka, renga, and in particular haikai. He studied renga with Sōgi. He was the son of Negi Morihide, and a Shintoist. At the age of 69, he became head priest of the Inner Ise Shrine.

Moritake's most famous poem:
A fallen blossom 
returning to the bough, I thought -- 
But no, a butterfly.
(Translation by Steven D. Carter)

Notes

External links

A history of Japanese literature

1473 births
1549 deaths
Japanese haiku poets